The Kartalab Khan Mosque or Begum Bazar Mosque, in the Begum Bazar area in old Dhaka, Bangladesh, was built by Nawab Diwan Murshid Quli Khan (alias Kartalab Khan) in 1701–04. It is beside the modern jail of the city.  The mosque consists of a high valuated platform, a mosque with a 'dochala' annex on the north upon the western half of the platform and a 'baoli' (stepped well) to the east of the platform. Unlike the three-domed mosques at Lalbagh Fort and the Khan Mohammad Mridha Mosque, it is roofed by five bulbous domes resting on octagonal drums. The whole mosque was once reconstructed by the Jamider of Dhaka, Mirza Golam Pir. In accordance with Murshid Quli Khan's wishes, he was buried under the entrance to this mosque.

History 
Kartalab Khan was appointed as Diwan (revenue administrator) of Bengal by Emperor Aurangazeb, when Azim-ush-Shan was Viceroy. His original name was Murshid Quli Khan but he earned the title of Kartalab Khan from Emperor Aurangazwb for his efficiency in revenue administration. After coming to Bengal he erected a mosque at Dhaka, known after his name.

Murshid Khuli Khan transferred the headquarters of the revenue administration from Dhaka to Mukshusabad, later renamed Murshidabad in the year A.D. 1704 when a tussle started with the Subedar.
 
The mosque is undoubtedly one of the most impressive Mughal structures of Dhaka, having been built on a high platform called 'tahkhana'. Underneath the platform there is a series of rectangular rooms that are let out to shopkeepers. A kitchen market was built to meet the expenses of the mosque.

In 1777, the control of the market was taken over by Begum daughter of the then Naib-e-Nazim Sharfaraz Khan. The name of the locality ‘Begumbazar’ and the masjid originate from her name. The 'Baoli', the only known example of its kind in Bengal, is considered to be of North Indian or Deccan origin, the latter possibility being more likely since its builder had been in Deccen before coming to Dhaka.

Architectural value 
As stated by Dani,

See also
 List of mosques in Bangladesh

Bibliography 
Mamoon, Muntasir. (1993). Dhaka-Smriti Bismritir Nogori. Dhaka: Anannya. (Page-182-183)
Rahman, Mahbubur, The city of an architect
MA Bari, Kartalab Khan Mosque in Banglapedia

References

Mosques in Dhaka
Religious buildings and structures completed in 1704
1704 establishments in Asia